The Maple River is the name of three rivers in the U.S. state of Michigan:

 Maple River (Burt Lake), rises in Pleasant View Township, Emmet County, and flows into Burt Lake in Cheboygan County
 Maple River (Grand River), rises in Shiawassee Township, Shiawassee County and flows through Clinton and Gratiot Counties before emptying into the Grand River in Ionia County
 Maple River (Muskegon River), a short river branch off the Muskegon River in Newaygo and Muskegon counties

See also 
 Little Maple River in Clinton County
 Maple River Township, Michigan in Emmet County

References 

Rivers of Michigan
Set index articles on rivers of Michigan